Anemone edwardsiana is a species of perennial wildflower in the buttercup family Ranunculaceae, with the common name Edwards Plateau Anemone. It is found on the Edwards Plateau in Texas.

Description
Anemone edwardsiana grows from tubers and produces several lobed basal leaves. The flower is held on a stalk up to 50 centimeters tall with a deeply divided leaf-like bract below the single (occasionally two) white flower. The flower may sometimes have a blue or red cast.

Range and Habitat
Anemone edwardsiana is found mostly on moist limestone bluffs and ledges and in rocky limestone-derived soils on the Edwards Plateau.

Taxonomy

References

edwardsiana
Flora of Texas
Plants described in 1945